FRAS may refer to:

 Fellow of the Royal Astronomical Society, post-nominal letters
 Fellow of the Royal Asiatic Society of Great Britain and Ireland, post-nominal letters
 Fire Retardant Anti Static, an Australian mining material safety test

See also
 FRAeS, Fellow of the Royal Aeronautical Society, post-nominal letters